The Bengaluru Beast was an Indian professional basketball team based in Bangalore, Karnataka, India. The team last competed in India's UBA Pro Basketball League as a member of the South Division along with three other teams. The team was established in 2015.

The Beast reached their first UBA Finals Series in season 4, as they overcame a 0-3 start to reach the finals where they lost to the eventual champions Mumbai Challengers.

Players
Bengaluru Beast season 4 roster

External links
Presentation at Asia-basket.com
Facebook

Basketball teams in India
Basketball in Bangalore
Basketball in Karnataka
Basketball teams established in 2015